Epistel No 5 (released September 28, 2012 by the label Inner Ear/Musikkkoperatørene - INEA 16) is a studio album by Vigleik Storaas Trio.

Critical reception 

In its very soft language Vigleik Storaas Trio performs the five of the nine compositions by Storaas, while Kenny Wheeler, Sam Rivers and Michel Legrand is «guest composers». The veterans Mats Eilertsen and Per Oddvar Johansen, in addition to Storaas, still know how to do it, with a majority of ballads, but in between there are more refined tunes like "Epistel" and the waltz "Eidsvoll". It is not merely beautiful, the trio also impresses with its secure interaction and ability to vary the rhythm and intensity. Reviewer Kjell Moe of the Norwegian newspaper Nordlys states:
''... It's not particularly original to be compared to Bill Evans, but Storaas' abilities with his distinct and clear language in the moderate and slow pace to add an extra dimension in the form of an understated excitement...

The review by Terje Mosnes of the Norwegian newspaper Dagbladet awarded the album dice 5.

Track listing 
"Aspire" (7:29)
"Epistel" (4:20)
"Mood Piece" (6:27)
"A Myriad Of Approaches" (6:12)
"Til Sivert" (4:59)
"Balladeer" (7:17)
"Eidsvoll" (5:03)
"Beatrice" (5:48)
"I Will Wait For You" (6:48)

Personnel 
Piano – Vigleik Storaas
Double bass – Mats Eilertsen
Drums – Per Oddvar Johansen

Credits 
Mastered by Jan Erik Kongshaug
Mixed by Jan Erik Kongshaug
Recorded by Jan Erik Kongshaug (tracks 1-8), Thomas Hukkelberg (track 9)

Notes 
Recorded May 21, 2011 at Rainbow Studio, Oslo, except track 9 recorded May 4, 2010 at Festiviteten, Eidsvoll 
Mixed and mastered April 24 and July 31, 2012

References 

Vigleik Storaas albums
2012 albums